Okeana, originally known as Tariff, is an unincorporated community in central Morgan Township, Butler County, Ohio, United States.  It is located on Dry Fork Creek, a tributary of the Great Miami River, on State Route 126 about three miles northwest of Shandon in sections 21 and 26 of R1ET3N of the Congress Lands.  It is a mile north of Alert, a mile east of Macedonia, and ten miles southwest of Hamilton.  The bulk of addresses served by the Okeana post office are in the Ross Local School District, but parts of the region are in the Southwest Local School District.

A post office was established there in 1828 as Tariff, but the name was changed to Okeana on May 27, 1858, after the daughter of the Indian chief Kiatta, for whom a stream in Morgan Township is named. The town of Okeana was established in 1858. The town was laid out by the Rev. Benjamin Lloyd.

The flag of Okeana, Ohio 
The blue heron bird image is displayed on the Okeana flag, deriving from the original flag of the Miami Native American Tribe of Ohio and Indiana (currently of Oklahoma). The Miami natives flag displays images of a turtle and the blue heron bird. The gold circle around “Okeana” represents Ohio, and is gold to represent Ross school district colors.

References

External links
Butler County Official Transportation Map, Butler County Engineer's Office, Fairfield Township, Butler County, Ohio
A History and Biographical Cyclopaedia of Butler County, Ohio with Illustrations and Sketches of Its Representative Men and Pioneers.  Cincinnati, Ohio:  Western Biographical Publishing Company, 1882. 

Unincorporated communities in Butler County, Ohio
Unincorporated communities in Ohio
Populated places established in 1828
1828 establishments in Ohio